This is a list of notable burial mounds in the United States built by Native Americans. Burial mounds were built by many different cultural groups over a span of many thousands of years, beginning in the Late Archaic period and continuing through the Woodland period up to the time of European contact.

Adena and Hopewell culture burial mounds

Mississippian culture burial mounds

See also 

 List of Adena culture sites
 List of Hopewell sites
 List of Mississippian sites
 List of the oldest buildings in the United States

References

External links

 International Architecture: database website

 
Burial mounds in the United States
Burial mounds in the United States
Burial mounds
Burial mounds in the United States
Burial mounds
Burial mounds
Historic preservation in the United States
Mound builders (people)
Burial mounds
United States